Traveller Supplement 13: Veterans is a 1983 tabletop role-playing game supplement, written by Tim Brown for Traveller published by Game Designers' Workshop. Veterans is a compilation of 234 pregenerated Mercenary characters. Thirteen Traveller supplements were published. A single collected volume was published by Far Future Enterprises in 2000.

Reception
Andy Slack reviewed Supplement 13: Veterans for White Dwarf #49, giving it an overall rating of 3 out of 10, and stated that "I feel this supplement [...] is pointless; I would rather see one full of predesigned Striker! equipment."

Frederick Paul Kiesche III reviewed Veterans in The Space Gamer No. 68. Kiesche commented that "This supplement will not appeal to every Traveller referee. It does not have the general usefulness of the Library Data supplements, for example. It is (obviously) most useful to those referees who like to run adventures using Mercenary and (to a lesser extent) Striker, or who allow their player characters to use the Mercenary character-generation system. However, I am more than happy to have purchased the supplement. There is nothing duller than sitting around and rolling out a group of characters for an upcoming encounter in a bar or street or wherever. I found GDW's 1001 Characters to be very useful in that respect, and expect to use Veterans in similar situations."

Reviews
 Different Worlds #39 (May/June, 1985)

See also
Classic Traveller Supplements

References

Role-playing game supplements introduced in 1983
Traveller (role-playing game) supplements